Theodore the Varangian and his son John (10th century) were the first known Christian martyrs in Rus'.

Biography 
Born in the 10th century, Theodore served in Byzantium for a long time, where he took holy baptism. He then moved to live in the city of Kiev. He had a son John, who also professed Christianity. He was one of the best prince combatants.

In ancient manuscripts are the following writing pagan named of Theodore: Tur (Scandinavian Thor) or Utor (Scandinavian Ottar).

St Nestor the Chronicler in his Primary Chronicle reports "And the elders and boyars said: 'let us cast lots upon the boys and girls. Upon whichever one it falls, that one we shall slaughter in sacrifice to the gods. The lots thrown by the pagan priests, evidently not by chance, fell upon the Christian John. When the messengers told Theodore that his son "had been chosen by the gods themselves to be sacrificed to them", the old warrior decisively answered: “This is not a god, but wood. Today it is, and tomorrow it rots. They do not eat, nor drink nor speak, but are crafted by human hands from wood. God however is One, and the Greeks serve and worship Him. He created heaven and earth, the stars and the moon, the sun and man, and foreordained him to live upon the earth. But these gods, what have they created? They themselves are made. I shall not give my son over to devils.” The pagans killed both father and son. Though they clearly had fewer ulterior motives than other early Russian martyrs, the two have a surprisingly meagre following.

The exact date of the death of Theodore and John is unknown. According to the traditional version, their demise came on July 12, 978, the day after Vladimir of Kiev's succession to the throne was celebrated with pagan thanksgiving to the gods including human sacrifices. Vladimir's march to Kiev that year had military and political objectives, but also was a religiously motivated attempt by Russian pagans among the ruling Varangians to suppress nascent Christianity in Kiev. However, some historians argue this event happened in summer of 983, during the revolt of the Gentiles throughout the Slavic-Germanic world.

According to legend, Theodore and John's courage standing alone against the crowd of angry pagans so impressed Vladimir with its sincerity that it influenced his decision to become a Christian.

References

Sources 
 Martyr Theodore and his son of Kiev
 The Holy Martyrs Theodore (Feodor) the Varangian and his son John

10th-century Christian martyrs
Russian saints
Varangians